Jatropha multifida, called coral plant, coralbush, and physic nut (a name it shares with other members of its genus), is a species of Jatropha native to Mexico and the Caribbean. A garden plant, it has been introduced to Florida, and to many places in South America, Africa, the Indian subcontinent, China and Southeast Asia. Mildly toxic, consumption causes gastrointestinal distress.

References

multifida
Plants described in 1753
Taxa named by Carl Linnaeus